Nosamo (acronym for 노무현을 사랑하는 사람들의 모임 "gathering of people who love Roh Moo-hyun") is an internet-based group organised in 2000 as a fan club for the South Korean politician and former president Roh Moo-hyun.

Nosamo started small (at a PC bang - internet cafes of South Korea - in Daejeon by a few netizens), but soon counted celebrities and prominent political figures among its growing number of members. In 2002, the group came into national prominence as an active force behind Roh's election to the presidency in a tight, bitterly fought contest that pitted Roh against the more established political figure of Lee Hoi-chang (see South Korean Presidential Election, 2002).

Lee, seen as the more conservative candidate, drew more support among the older generation, while most of Roh's support came from the younger generation. Nosamo is widely credited with mobilising the younger voters in the election; its efforts included a mobile-phone campaign on election day to urge young voters to cast their ballots.

After Roh's victory in the election, Nosamo remained an important source of political support for the president, particularly in 2004 when the South Korean parliament voted to impeach him for illegal electioneering and incompetence; Nosamo members organised a candlelight vigil in protest.

Because Nosamo as an internet-based political organisation has very little precedent in Korea or elsewhere, it has attracted a fair amount of criticism. Some have questioned whether some of Nosamo's campaign strategies broke election laws, and the selection of prominent Nosamo members as Roh's close aides has invited charges of favouritism. Later, some of these aides were involved in corruption scandals. As of 2005, Nosamo had lost some of its political momentum as Roh's presidency saw a dip in popularity among his core supporters due to his labour policies and the deployment of troops to Iraq.

External links
 Official English page of Roh Moo-Hyun
 The Uri Party (in Korean)
 Nosamo: Roh Moo-hyun's fan club (in Korean)

See also: Politics of South Korea

Political organizations based in South Korea